Combrew is a small settlement in Devon, England. It is near the town of Barnstaple.

External links
Combrew at Streetmap.co.uk

Villages in Devon